The 2002 Sanex WTA Tour was the elite professional tennis circuit organized by the Women's Tennis Association (WTA) for the 2002 tennis season. The WTA Tour calendar comprised the Grand Slam tournaments (supervised by the International Tennis Federation (ITF)), the WTA Tier I-V Events, the Fed Cup (organized by the ITF) and the year-end championships.

New tournaments created for the 2002 season included the Proximus Diamond Games in Antwerp, Belgium; a new green clay event, the Sarasota Clay Court Classic, in Sarasota, U.S.; and the Nordea Nordic Light Open held in Espoo, Finland. Another new tournament was created to be held in Aarhus, Denmark, but was later cancelled. Also, the French Community Championships moved cities from Knokke-Heist to Brussels, and the Kroger St. Jude Championship was moved from Oklahoma City, U.S. to a new location in Memphis.

Season summary 
Serena Williams was the outright player of the year, ascending to No. 1 for the first time in July and holding it for the rest of that season. She missed the Australian Open due to injury, having won her second, third and fourth Grand Slam singles titles at the French Open, Wimbledon, and the US Open, beating her sister Venus in all three finals. This would lead to her non-calendar Grand Slam (dubbed the "Serena Slam") which she would complete at the Australian Open the following year. Her win–loss record for the year was 56–5. Venus also ascended to the No. 1 ranking in February, and finished the season at No. 2. Jennifer Capriati defended her Australian Open title to win her third Grand Slam title, after the two she won in 2001.

Virginia Ruano Pascual and Paola Suárez were the doubles team of the year, and finished the season as the top 2 on the individual rankings. Their titles at the French Open and the U.S. Open represented their second and third Slam titles together. The Williams sisters won their fifth Grand Slam doubles title together at Wimbledon, and Martina Hingis and Anna Kournikova won their second doubles title together at the Australian Open, with it being Hingis' 9th overall.

Former No. 1 Arantxa Sánchez Vicario announced her retirement at the end of the season, although she returned in 2004 to play doubles tournaments.

Schedule 
The table below shows the 2002 WTA Tour schedule.

Key

January

February

March

April

May

June

July

August

September

October

November

Rankings 
Below are the 2002 WTA year-end rankings in both singles and doubles competition:

Singles

Number 1 ranking

Doubles

Number 1 ranking

Statistics 
List of players and titles won, last name alphabetically:
  Serena Williams – Scottsdale, Miami, Rome, French Open, Wimbledon, U.S. Open, Tokyo Princess Cup and Leipzig (8)
  Venus Williams – Gold Coast, Paris, Antwerp, Amelia Island, Stanford, San Diego and New Haven (7)
  Kim Clijsters – Hamburg, Filderstadt, Luxembourg and WTA Tour Championships (4)
  Anna Smashnova – Auckland, Canberra, Vienna and Shanghai (4)
  Elena Bovina – Warsaw and Quebec City (2)
  Jelena Dokić – Sarasota and Birmingham (2)
  Justine Henin – Berlin and Linz (2)
  Martina Hingis – Sydney and Tokyo Pan Pacific (2)
  Svetlana Kuznetsova – Espoo and Bali (2)
  Amélie Mauresmo – Dubai and Montreal (2)
  Chanda Rubin – Eastbourne and Los Angeles (2)
  Monica Seles – Doha and Madrid (2)
  Cara Black – Waikoloa (1)
  Jennifer Capriati – Australian Open (1)
  Myriam Casanova – Brussels (1)
  Jill Craybas – Tokyo Japan Open (1)
  Eleni Daniilidou – 's-Hertogenbosch (1)
  Mariana Díaz Oliva – Palermo (1)
  Silvia Farina Elia – Strasbourg (1)
  Marie-Gayanay Mikaelian – Tashkent (1)
  Daniela Hantuchová – Indian Wells (1)
  Iva Majoli – Charleston (1)
  Magdalena Maleeva – Moscow (1)
  Maja Matevžič – Bratislava (1)
  Ángeles Montolio – Porto (1)
  Martina Müller – Budapest (1)
  Anastasia Myskina – Bahia (1)
  Lisa Raymond – Memphis (1)
  Dinara Safina – Sopot (1)
  Patty Schnyder – Zurich (1)
  Magüi Serna – Estoril (1)
  Katarina Srebotnik – Acapulco (1)
  Martina Suchá – Hobart (1)
  Åsa Svensson – Bol (1)
  Patricia Wartusch – Casablanca (1)
  Angelique Widjaja – Pattaya City (1)
  Fabiola Zuluaga – Bogotá (1)

The following players won their first title:
  Martina Suchá – Hobart
  Daniela Hantuchová – Indian Wells
  Magüi Serna – Estoril
  Martina Müller – Budapest
  Elena Bovina – Warsaw
  Marie-Gayanay Mikaelian – Tashkent
  Eleni Daniilidou – 's-Hertogenbosch
  Myriam Casanova – Brussels
  Mariana Díaz Oliva – Palermo
  Dinara Safina – Sopot
  Svetlana Kuznetsova – Espoo
  Cara Black – Waikoloa
  Jill Craybas – Tokyo Japan Open
  Maja Matevžič – Bratislava

Titles won by nation:
  – 22 (Gold Coast, Australian Open, Paris, Antwerp, Doha, Memphis, Scottsdale, Miami, Amelia Island, Rome, Madrid, French Open, Eastbourne, Wimbledon, Stanford, San Diego, Los Angeles, New Haven, U.S. Open, Tokyo Princess Cup, Leipzig and Tokyo Japan Open)
  – 6 (Hamburg, Berlin, Filderstadt, Linz, Luxembourg and WTA Tour Championships)
  – 6 (Warsaw, Sopot, Espoo, Bahia, Quebec City and Bali)
  – 5 (Sydney, Tokyo Pan Pacific, Tashkent, Brussels and Zurich)
  – 4 (Auckland, Canberra, Vienna and Shanghai)
  – 2 (Porto and Estoril)
  – 2 (Dubai and Montreal)
  – 2 (Acapulco and Bratislava)
  – 2 (Hobart and Indian Wells)
  – 2 (Sarasota and Birmingham)
  – 1 (Palermo)
  – 1 (Casablanca)
  – 1 (Moscow)
  – 1 (Bogotá)
  – 1 (Charleston)
  – 1 (Budapest)
  – 1 ('s-Hertogenbosch)
  – 1 (Pattaya City)
  – 1 (Strasbourg)
  – 1 (Bol)
  – 1 (Waikoloa)

See also 
 2002 ATP Tour
 WTA Tour
 List of female tennis players
 List of tennis tournaments

External links 
 Women's Tennis Association (WTA) official website

References 

 
WTA Tour
WTA Tour seasons